Mary W. Chapin (1820–1889) was an American educator who served as the third president (referred to at that time as "acting principal" and "principal") of Mount Holyoke College (then Mount Holyoke Female Seminary) from 1850 to 1852 and Principal from 1852 to 1865.  She graduated from Mount Holyoke in 1841 and taught there for seven years before becoming Head.

See also
Presidents of Mount Holyoke College

References

External links
"Mary Williams Chapin 1843"
Memorials of Mary W. (Chapin) Pease and Lydia W. Shattuck, (1890)
Mount Holyoke College: The Seventy-fifth Anniversary, South Hadley, Mass., October 8th and 9th, 1912, (1913)

Mount Holyoke College alumni
Mount Holyoke College faculty
Presidents and Principals of Mount Holyoke College
1820 births
1889 deaths